Dzala ertobashia (Georgian: ძალა ერთობაშია, "Strength is in Unity") is the official motto of Georgia.

It originally comes from a famous fable by Sulkhan-Saba Orbeliani of the same name. According to this fable, once upon a time there lived a king with thirty sons. One day, when he was dying, he called his sons and asked them to bring arrows. Then king asked them to break the arrows one by one, and the sons did. The king then asked them to break the arrows all at once, and they could not. The king said: "Teach O my sons from this fact, that there is ‘strength in unity.’ If you are together, an enemy cannot do you wrong, but if you are divided, victory will be on their side."

The problem of unity is very real for the Georgian state, exemplified by the ongoing Russian occupations of South Ossetia and Abkhazia, and thus was likely a factor in the decision to make the phrase the national motto.

Usage elsewhere
Versions of this phrase are the national mottos of Belgium, Bulgaria, and Haiti, and also formerly in the historical Traansvaal, Union of South Africa (as Ex Unitate Vires), and Malaya. There is a popular legend in Bulgaria about Kubrat, ruler of Great Bulgaria, who also gave his sons the same advice by the same example.

See also

 The Old Man and his Sons
 Skilurus, a legendary Scythian king who asked his sons to break a bundle of arrows
 Ex Unitate Vires

National symbols of Georgia (country)
National mottos
Georgian words and phrases